Santiago "Santi" Herrero Amor was a Spanish futsal player (Winger and back). Born in Zaragoza, Aragon, Spain.

Career
He raised in AJC Palafox team, he was FIFA Futsal World Champ in 2000 with Spain in Nicaragua. He was also UEFA European (1998) and League Champion with CLM Talavera (1997), and League (1995) and Cup (1993) champion  for Sego Zaragoza. He ended his career as player in Sala 10 Zaragoza (DKV), where ha was played in 80's.

External links
 futsalplanet

1971 births
Living people
Sportspeople from Zaragoza
Spanish men's futsal players
AD Sala 10 players